Garcinia magnifolia, also known as bebasajo or giant leaf madrono, is a flowering tree in the family Clusiaceae or Guttiferae.

Distribution
Garcinia magnifolia is native to Costa Rica, Panama, western Colombia, Ecuador, northern Peru, southern Guyana, Suriname, French Guiana, and northern Brazil.

Description
The tree rarely exceeds  in height and is dioecious but is capable of self-pollination. It is fairly cold tolerant, with mature trees surviving brief temperatures of 28 F (-2 C), and has evergreen leaves which are elliptical in shape. It often begins to produce fruit after 5–7 years of developing, and the fruit arils are edible, which have been described as being sub-acid to sour in flavor. The flowers develop in clusters on wood that is at least two years old. It is adaptable to many different soils but in neutral, alkaline, or deficient soils it may suffer from iron deficiency. It can grow in full shade, but fruiting may be limited. It does not tolerate salt but does tolerate moderate drought. It is also able to be grown in 15-25 gallon containers.

Uses
The fruit is occasionally eaten and it is planted as an ornamental.

See also
List of Garcinia species

References

magnifolia
Trees of South America
Plants described in 1989
Fruits originating in South America
Fruit trees
Trees of the Amazon
Trees of Central America
Edible fruits